The Border Violence Monitoring Network (BVMN) is a coalition of over 14 organizations founded in 2016 whose stated goal is "documenting illegal pushbacks & police violence by EU [European Union] member state authorities in the Western Balkans and Greece ".   The organization was founded in 2016 and is regarded as an authoritative source on pushbacks and refugee protection.

In 2018, BVMN recorded video footage of pushbacks along the Croatian–Bosnian border, which was widely circulated online. In 2019, it reported 3,251 pushbacks either from Croatia to Bosnia and Herzegovina or from Greece to Turkey. To date, BVMN has documented over 1281 pushbacks from 16 countries.

Key Publications

Black Book of Pushbacks 
In December 2020, it published the Black Book of Pushbacks, a two-volume work that documents the experiences of 12,654 migrants who suffered from human rights violations while traveling on the Balkan route in the previous four years, in collaboration with the United Left group in the European Parliament. At the book launch, German MEP Cornelia Ernst called the incidents described in the book "reminiscent of brutal dictatorships" and said that she hopes the book "will contribute to bringing an end to these crimes and holding the governments that are responsible accountable".

Torture Report 
In 2020, BVMN released a 51-page report into the use of torture or other inhuman treatment during pushbacks. This report was based upon 286 statements from migrants and refugee. Among the BVMN's findings is that in 2020, 90% of pushed-back migrants interviewed experienced "some form of degrading treatment or torture" from border guards. According to the BVMN's report, the most common form of violence during pushbacks is beating or kicking migrants, including the use of dogs or attempted lynching. Use of electric weapons has been reported against 362 people. Thirty-seven percent of migrants reported being forced to undress, which almost doubled compared to 2019. In some cases, the migrants' clothes were burned so that they were forced back across the border while naked, or they were detained while naked. Twenty-three percent of cases involved threats with firearms.

Monthly Report 
Every month the Border Violence Monitoring Network publishes a report summarizing recent trends in pushbacks and other important developments. The report focuses on the situation in Greece and countries on the Balkan Route - analysing events all the way from Evros to the Slovenian-Italian border.

Structure

Partner Organizations 
BVMN works via a horizontal network of member groups. The members are NGOs, coo-ops, collectives and grassroots initiatives spread across the Western Balkans, Greece and Turkey. Members sit on an open assemby, and each contribute to various different working groups within BVMN. The following organization are named partners within the Border Violence Monitoring Network, but some partners choose to remain anonymous.

 Are You Syrious?  
 Centre For Peace Studies
 Collective Aid 
 Disinfaux Collective
 Fresh Response 
 Infokolpa
 Josoor
 Mare Liberum
 Mobile Info Team
 No Name Kitchen
 [RE:]ports SARAJEVO
 Rigardu eV

Funding and Finances 
The finances of the Border Violence Monitoring Network are based on:

 Funds from Foundations and Grants
 Member fees from BVMN’s legal frame Rigardu e.V.
 Donations from BVMN supporters

Currently BVMN receives support from the following foundations:

 Open Society Foundations
 European Programme for Integration and Migration
 European Cultural Foundation

References

Further reading

External links

2016 establishments in Europe
European migrant crisis
Human rights organizations based in Europe
Criticism of police brutality